Benjamin Joseph Dichter (born 1975 or 1976) was a leader in the 2022 Canadian convoy protest. He is also a gemologist, former print shop operator, A-Z owner-operator, and author, from Toronto, Canada. He is the founder of the LGBTQ conservative group LGBTory.

Dichter was the candidate for Toronto Centre-Rosedale in the 2014 Toronto municipal election, and the 2015 Conservative candidate for Toronto-Danforth. He lost in both elections.  He has been noted for criticisms of partisan divisiveness, and of political tolerance toward extremism.

Early life and education 
Dichter was adopted by a Jewish family and attended the Associated Hebrew Schools of Toronto and the York Mills Collegiate Institute.

Career 
Dichter has worked as a gemologist, as a truck owner-operator, and as a print shop operator in Toronto.  He patented an invention for motorcycles, registered in 2003.

Dichter has produced several podcasts, covering topics of philosophy, law, crime, terrorism, and the SARS-CoV-2 pandemic.  Some podcasts include The Quiggin Report (anti-terrorism, Islamic extremism), the Open College podcast (philosophy, history, politics), and Not On Record (crime, legal research, investigations).  He is the founder of Possibly Correct Media, that publishes a podcast by the same name.

Politics 

In 2014, Dichter ran for Toronto city council for Toronto Centre-Rosedale, winning approximately 1,500 out of 31,000 votes, (just under five per cent). His platform focused on budgets, infrastructure, transit, a desire to avoid partisanship politics, and a specific ambition to create affordable low-rise housing. Kristyn Wong-Tam won the riding.

After the original candidate Tim Dutaud was dropped by the federal Conservative party of Canada, Dichter ran as the candidate for the Toronto-Danforth riding in 2015. Dichter was the only candidate to not turn up for a climate change debate and likewise missed the debate on electoral reform. He won 5,478 votes, ranking third, behind winner Liberal Julie Dabrusin and runner up New Democratic Parity incumbent Craig Scott.

Dichter is the founder of LGBTory, the Rainbow Conservatives of Canada.

In 2016-2017, Dichter raised criticism against political tolerance to risk, from Islamic extremists. On 13 June 2016, Dichter and members of LGBTory attended a vigil in Toronto for the victims of the Orlando nightclub shooting; later criticizing some political and activist attendees, for hijacking the event.   In 2019, at a People's Party of Canada's first national convention, Dichter did the opening keynote speech where he spoke about "political Islam" and how it has "infiltrated" the Liberal party and the Conservative party of Canada. Maxime Bernier thanked Dichter for raising questions about how Canada dealt with Islamic extremism.

Canada convoy protest 

On 14 January 2022, Dichter co-organized the GoFundMe crowd-funding for the Canada convoy protest. A successful court injunction from local residents and businesses forced the funds to be frozen, prompting Dichter to accuse GoFundMe of theft. In February 2022, Dichter agreed to move the funds into an escrow account.

Dichter has was a spokespeople for the Canada convoy protest. When asked, he expressed no concern at the presence of confederate flags at the event.

In January 2022, he called on protestors to be peaceful.

As police moved to stop the protest, Dichter called on protestors to stand their ground, and called on police to let drivers remove their vehicles, before leaving Ottawa himself.

He has self-published the book Honking for Freedom: The Truckers Convoy that Gave us Hope that was ghost written with former journalist John Goddard. In the book, Dichter claimed that the Nazi flags observed at the protest were planted by agents of the Government of Canada, while later conceding in a 2022 interview with Canadian Jewish News that the flag may have been held by protestors.

Dichter is target of a $300 million class-action lawsuit launched by Ottawa residents.

At the Public Order Emergency Commission, Dichter testified that he had sought the removal of Pat King from the protest leadership, and organised a crypto currency fundraiser for the protest.

Views and punditry 
Dichter promotes use of Bitcoin, including during the Ottawa protest and afterwards, speaking about use of cryptocurrency to keep crowdsourced donations outside of government control. He has stated that the Liberal Party of Canada is "infested with Islamists". He has said that "Justin Trudeau must be stopped…no matter the cost” and has described all politicians of all parties as "all horrible, all of them". The Toronto Friends of Simon Wiesenthal Centre has stated that Dichters comments on Islam as potentially islamophobic. His anti-Islam views have were noted in the New York Times in 2022, the Guardian quoted his warning of the “growing Islamization of Canada”. Dichter has asked God to bless Ted Cruz and Ron DeSantis.

He has criticized Pride Toronto for banning police, describing it as having gone "full circle from being a civil rights cause to a celebration to a form of regressive left political weaponry".

Dichter is a regular pundit on Fox News and on 27 January 2022, he was a guest on Tucker Carlson's Fox News program. He spoke about his journey to Ottawa ahead of the Ottawa protests, and how Alberta looked like a "third-world country" due the trucking industry being affected by the COVID-19 pandemic. He has also appeared on Russian state controlled media RT.

Personal life 
Dichter lives in the Danforth area of Toronto. He has previously lived in South America.

He was aged 46 in December 2022. He has a brother, who is a police officer.

See also 
2014 and 2015 politics
 2014 Toronto municipal election
 Results of the 2015 Canadian federal election by riding
2022 protests
 Tamara Lich
 Pat King
 COVID-19 pandemic in Canada
 COVID-19 protests in Canada

References

External links 

 LGBTory - official website
 Armin Rosen, The Freedom Convoy's Renegade Jew, Tablet Magazine, 21 June 2022
 Tense exchange between lawyer, convoy organizer Benjamin Dichter, CTV News YouTube Channel, 3 Nov 2022

Year of birth missing (living people)
Living people
Canadian truck drivers
Activists from Toronto
Canadian conspiracy theorists
Canadian podcasters
Canadian political candidates
COVID-19 pandemic in Canada
Canadian founders
Canadian critics of Islam
Anti-Islam sentiment in Canada
Protesters involved in the Canada convoy protest
1970s births